HLA-B35 (B35) is an HLA-B serotype. The serotype identifies the more common HLA-B*35 gene products.
B35 is one of the largest B serotype groups, it currently has 97 known nucleotide variants and 86 polypeptide isoforms. (For terminology help see: HLA-serotype tutorial). This variant is particularly susceptible to HIV infection.

Serotype

References

3